The 4th (Queen Augusta) Guards Grenadier Regiment (Königin Augusta Garde-Grenadier-Regiment Nr. 4) was an infantry regiment of the Royal Prussian Army. It was established in 1860 in Koblenz and until 1893 it was the only one of the Prussian Guards outside the region around the German capital Berlin.

The regiment was named after Queen Augusta in 1890 - to commemorate her death. The Guards moved to Spandau in 1893 and in 1897 to Moabit. Last commander was Walter Freiherr von Schleinitz (1872-1950) in summer 1918.

See also
List of Imperial German infantry regiments

References
 Christine Monika Richter: Das Denkmal für die Gefallenen des Königin Augusta Garde-Grenadier-Regiments Nr. 4 auf dem Garnisonfriedhof in Berlin-Neukölln. In: Jahrbuch des Vereins für die Geschichte Berlins, 2004.
 Günter Wegner, Stellenbesetzung der deutschen Heere 1815-1939. (Biblio Verlag, Osnabrück, 1993), Vol. 1.

Guards regiments of the Prussian Army
Grenadier regiments